Fabian Holland may refer to:
 Fabian Holland (footballer)
 Fabian Holland (rugby union)